Demisa may be,

Demisa language
Shure Demisa